"Curly Sue" is a song by the Swedish rock band Takida and was the second single released from their second album, Bury the Lies. The song was released as a single on 10 October 2007. The song was co-produced by Takida and Patrik Frisk at Sidelake Studios in Sundsvall, Sweden.

Reception
The track received varied reviews from the press. Örnsköldsviks Allehanda called the song "one of the albums low water marks" and "plain".

Chart performance
According to IFPI it went gold in Sweden in May 2009.

The song entered the Swedish Top 60 at fifty-two on 4 October 2007 and peaked at number one on 24 July 2008. All and all it spent a total of 63 weeks on the chart which makes it the longest-running single ever on the chart, and puts the single as #1 of the Top 100 of all Singles in the Swedish charts since 1975.

The band also had a huge success with the song on the Tracks chart. The song entered the chart at spot twenty on 20 October 2007 and had climbed to number one ten weeks later, a spot that it held for ten weeks. It spent 50 weeks and over a year on the chart and was the most successful song of 2008. As of 21 June 2009 it holds the longevity record on the chart as well.

The song had a huge success on Svensktoppen where it entered the chart on the second of February 2008, later on peaking at number two and spending a total of 54 weeks on the chart. Making it the ninth longest-running single there.

Charts

Weekly charts

Year-end charts

Certifications

References

Takida songs
Number-one singles in Sweden
2007 singles
2007 songs